Joaquín Climent Asensi (born 7 September 1958) is a Spanish actor. He is primarily recognised as an established supporting actor in both film and television works. He has also performed in stage plays. He became popular for his role as Pascual in the police television series El comisario.

Biography 
Joaquín Climent Asensi was born on 7 September 1958 in Requena, province of Valencia. His first stable television role was that of Vicente Campillo in Querido maestro, whose broadcasting run spanned from 1997 to 1998.

He was married to actress Adriana Ozores with whom he has one child.

Filmography 

Film

Television

Accolades

References 

1958 births
Living people
20th-century Spanish male actors
21st-century Spanish male actors
Spanish male television actors
Spanish male stage actors
Spanish male film actors
Male actors from the Valencian Community